Tichborne is a village in Hampshire, England. The term may also refer to:

People:
 Chidiock Tichborne (1558–1586), English conspirator and poet
 Nancy Tichborne (born 1942), New Zealand watercolour artist
 Nicholas Tichborne (16th century – 1601), English activist
 Thomas Tichborne (1567–1602), English religious leader
 Tichborne Aston (1723–1748), Irish politician

Other uses:
 Tichborne, Ontario, village in Central Frontenac Township, in Canada
 Tichborne baronets, two baronetcies in the Baronetage of England
 Tichborne case, 19th century fraud prosecution of someone claiming to be Sir Roger Tichborne
 Tichborne Dole, English charity festival held in Tichborne